Hypselohaptodus is a genus of sphenacodont synapsid from the Cisuralian of England. It contains a single species, Hypselohaptodus grandis, and is known only from a single specimen, a partial left maxilla, which is hosted at the Warwick County Museum. It was collected at Kenilworth, Warwickshire, England, from the Kenilworth Sandstone Formation (Warwickshire Group), dating to the earliest Asselian stage of the Cisuralian series, about 299  million years ago.

H. grandis was originally assigned to Haptodus by Paton in 1974. In 2015 it was determined that H. grandis and Haptodus garnettensis were not congeneric with Haptodus baylei  and in 2019 Frederik Spindler reassigned H. grandis to a new genus, Hypselohaptodus.

References

Prehistoric sphenacodonts
Prehistoric synapsid genera
Cisuralian synapsids of Europe
Permian England
Fossils of England
Fossil taxa described in 2019